Homopholis is a genus of Australian plants in the grass family.

Species
The only known species is Homopholis belsonii, native to the States of Queensland and New South Wales in Australia.

formerly included
see Panicum 
Homopholis proluta  - Panicum prolutum

References

Panicoideae
Bunchgrasses of Australasia
Endemic flora of Australia
Taxa named by Charles Edward Hubbard